Events from the year 1707 in Russia:

Incumbents
 Monarch – Peter I

Events

 
 
  
 
 
 Bulavin Rebellion

Births

Deaths

References

 
Years of the 18th century in Russia